Lucas High School is located in Lucas, Ohio, United States and is part of the Lucas Local School District.

Mission statement
"We are here to prepare students to achieve and succeed."

Athletics
Football	
Baseball	
Basketball	
Volleyball
Softball
Cross Country 	
Cheerleading	
Track and Field
Wrestling
	
The Lucas football team has participated in the 2000, 2006, 2014, 2015, 2016, 2017, 2018, 2019, 2020 and 2021 state playoffs. In 2019, the football team played in the D7 state championship on December 7, 2019 at the Tom Benson Stadium and lost to Marion Local by a score of 28-6. In 1991, the Lucas baseball team reached the state semi-finals. In 2005, Angela Foss won the schools only individual state championship. She took first place at the state meet in the pole vault. In 2017, the girls softball team reached the state semi-finals.

League Affiliation
Richland County League: 19??-1963
Johnny Appleseed Conference: 1963-1967
Independent: 1967-1968
Mid-Buckeye Conference: 1968-1979
Black Fork Valley Conference: 1979-1981
Mid-Buckeye Conference: 1981-1998
North Central Conference: 1998-2013
Mid-Buckeye Conference: 2013-

Clubs
Leo Club	
FCCLA	
CACY	
National Honor Society	
Spanish Club	
Academic Challenge	
FFA	
Big Brothers, Big Sisters	
Ski Club	
Band

Class offerings
Calculus	
Algebra I, II	
Advanced Mathematics	
Transition to College Mathematics	
Geometry	
Pre-Algebra	
Physics	
Chemistry	
Physical Science	
Integrated Science	
Biology	
Astronomy	
Anatomy and Physiology	
Marine Science	
Spanish I, II, III, IV	
French I, II, III	
English 8, 9, 10, 11, 12	
English College Prep I, II	
Keyboarding	
Computer Applications	
Social Studies 8	
American History	
World History	
Government	
Sociology	
Psychology	
Art I, II, III, IV	
Physical Education	
Health	
Music	
Industrial Technology	
Construction I, II	
Manufacturing I, II	
Agricultural Science I, II, III	
Agricultural Business	
Healthy Living I, II	
Foods With Flare	
Designing Your Future	
Child Development	
Money Smarts

Report card

During the 2010–2011 academic year, Lucas High School received a high percentage rate of tenth grade students who passed the Ohio Graduation Test. These percentages are above or at the proficient level:
		
Reading 100%	
Mathematics 100%	
Writing 100%	
Science 96.9%	
Social Studies 100%
	 	
The state of Ohio recognized the Lucas Local school district's designation as excellent.

Notable alumni and faculty

Tim Seder - Football player for the Dallas Cowboys and the Jacksonville Jaguars. He also taught health and physical education at Lucas High School; and coached the football, baseball, and basketball teams.

References

http://www.lucascubs.org
http://sportsillustrated.cnn.com/thenetwork/news/2000/11/22/profile_seder/
http://lhscubs.olinesports.com/
https://web.archive.org/web/20120120182630/http://www.lucascubs.org/high_school_course_syllabus.htm
http://www.ode.state.oh.us/reportcardfiles/2010-2011/DIST/049445.pdf
https://www.facebook.com/pages/Lucas-Cubs-Football/291740487507391?sk=info

External links
 Lucas High School profile—GreatSchools.net
 Lucas Local Schools profile—City-Data.com
Lucas High School--Official Site

High schools in Richland County, Ohio
Public high schools in Ohio